Bill Carden (24 May 1886 – 24 August 1962) was an Australian rules footballer who played with Collingwood in the Victorian Football League.

Notes

External links 

		
Bill Carden's profile at Collingwood Forever

1886 births
1962 deaths
Australian rules footballers from Victoria (Australia)
Collingwood Football Club players
Prahran Football Club players
Australian military personnel of World War I